The Canon EOS R6 Mark II is a midrange full-frame mirrorless interchangeable-lens camera produced by Canon. It was announced as the successor to the Canon EOS R6 on November 2, 2022. It includes various systems developed for the high-end Canon EOS R3 in a more compact body. It was generally well-received, with reviewers praising its hybrid capabilities but criticising the lack of support for third-party lenses.

Features 

 24.2 megapixel full-frame CMOS sensor
 Continuous shooting at 12fps with mechanical shutter / 40fps with electronic shutter
 DIGIC X image processor
 6K video recording at 60 fps, including ProRes RAW output with external storage medium
 1080p at 180 fps
 100% autofocus coverage
 1,053 autofocus points
 Native ISO range of 100 to 102,400; expandable to 50 and 204,800
 8 stops of 5-axis in-body image stabilization 
 Dual UHS-II SD memory card slots
 0.5" 3.69 million dots OLED electronic viewfinder with a 120 fps refresh rate
 Vari-angle LCD touchscreen
 Dual Pixel CMOS AF II

References 

Canon RF-mount cameras
Cameras introduced in 2022
Full-frame mirrorless interchangeable lens cameras